Sir John Sealy Edward Townsend, FRS (7 June 1868 – 16 February 1957) was an Irish-British mathematical physicist who conducted various studies concerning the electrical conduction of gases (concerning the kinetics of electrons and ions) and directly measured the electrical charge. He was a Wykeham Professor of physics at Oxford University.

The phenomenon of the electron avalanche was discovered by him, and is known as the Townsend discharge.

Career
John Townsend was born at Galway in County Galway, Ireland, son of Edward Townsend, a Professor of Civil Engineering at Queen's College Galway and Judith Townsend. In 1885, he entered Trinity College Dublin, was elected a Scholar of the College in 1888, and came top of the class in mathematics with a BA in 1890. He became a Clerk Maxwell Scholar and entered Trinity College, Cambridge, where he became a research student at the same time as Ernest Rutherford. At the Cavendish laboratory, he studied under J. J. Thomson. He developed the "Townsend's collision theory". Townsend supplied important work to the electrical conductivity of gases ("Townsend discharge" circa 1897). This work determined the elementary electrical charge with the droplet method. This method was improved later by Robert Andrews Millikan.

In 1900, Townsend became a Wykeham Professor of Physics at Oxford. In 1901, he discovered the ionization of molecules by ion impact and the dependence of the mean free path on electrons (in gases) of the energy (and his independent studies concerning the collisions between atoms and low-energy electrons in the 1920s would later be called the Ramsauer–Townsend effect). On 11 June 1903, he was elected to Fellow of the Royal Society (FRS). He was awarded the Hughes Medal in 1914. During World War I, he researched, at Woolwich, wireless methods for the Royal Naval Air Service.

Townsend was a laboratory demonstrator when Brebis Bleaney was an undergraduate. Bleaney recounts an occasion when Townsend gathered together all the demonstrators and proceeded to refute both quantum mechanics and relativity.

Between the two world wars, Townsend led an effective small group of researchers, often Rhodes scholars, of whom some became distinguished physicists. However, by the 1930s he had become less effective. He was seen as a boring lecturer, a dogmatic supervisor, and out of touch with the wider world of physics. As the 1930s went on, no German refugees sought refuge in his laboratory, while Lindemann, Dr Lee's professor of Physics, gained eight refugee physicists, some of whom gave his department an international reputation in the world of low temperature physics. In the late 1930s, the University decided to build a new Clarendon Laboratory Building and looked closely at the relations between Oxford's two physics laboratories. There was a suggestion to convert the Wykeham chair into one for theoretical physics. In 1941, Townsend's career came to an unhappy end. He had refused to support the war effort by teaching service-men, and the university appointed a visitorial board. This found Townsend guilty of misconduct and advised him that he would be dismissed unless he agreed to resign. Townsend, knighted in January 1941, resigned in September, subject to confidentiality.
 
John Townsend spent his retirement in Oxford, where he died in 1957 in the Acland Nursing Home.

Townsend married May Georgiana Lambert, also from County Galway, and they had two sons. His wife took an interest in politics, became a city councillor, and was twice Mayor of Oxford.

Works
 The Theory of Ionisation of Gases by Collision (1910)
 Motion of Electrons in Gases (1925)
 Electricity and Radio Transmission (1943)
 Electromagnetic Waves (1951)

See also
 Townsend Building of the Clarendon Laboratory in Oxford

References

Further reading

External links
 
 "Papers and correspondence of Sir John Sealy Edward Townsend, 1868–1957". Bodleian Library, Oxford. (ed. compiled between 1914 and 1957.)
 Entry in The Townsend (Townshend) Family Records

1868 births
1957 deaths
Alumni of Trinity College, Cambridge
Alumni of Trinity College Dublin
British physicists
Electrical breakdown
Fellows of New College, Oxford
Fellows of the Royal Society
Knights Bachelor
People associated with electricity
People from Galway (city)
Scholars of Trinity College Dublin
Wykeham Professors of Physics